Rate Your Students was a weblog that ran from November 2005 to June 2010. It was started by a "tenured humanities professor from the South," but was run for most of its five years by a rotating group of anonymous academics. The blog has not been updated since Dec 2010.

In an article from the Arizona State Web Devil, one of many that appeared on the site, the original moderator said that the impulse to start the blog was:

The site received much national press in early 2006, the Chronicle of Higher Education and Inside Higher Ed. Both weighed in:

But some college newspapers were dismissive, including the Cavalier Daily, the weekly student newspaper at the University of Virginia, where one editor wrote:

References

Further reading
 Professors Even the Score – from Harvard Crimson
 Teacher Blog Rates Students – from The Daily Free Press (Boston)
 
 Prof's Ills Find Home in Blog – from News Observer (Raleigh)
 Professor's Site Mocks Rate My Professors – from Penn State Daily Collegian
 Hot for Teacher – from Village Voice
 Turning the Table on Students – from New York Times

External links
 
 Rate Your Students – from Inside Higher Ed

American review websites
Works about academia
Educational personnel assessment and evaluation
Internet properties established in 2005